Levani Matiashvili (born 4 June 1993) is a Georgian judoka. He won one of the bronze medals in men's team event at the World Judo Championships in 2014 and in 2015.

He won one of the bronze medals in the men's +100 kg event at the 2020 European Judo Championships held in Prague, Czech Republic.

References

External links
 

Living people
1993 births
Place of birth missing (living people)
Male judoka from Georgia (country)
Judoka at the 2015 European Games
European Games medalists in judo
European Games silver medalists for Georgia (country)
21st-century people from Georgia (country)